, shortly Bola Preta, is a carnival block that parades every carnival Saturday in Rio de Janeiro, Brazil. Bola Preta was founded in 1918. The main rhythm is marchinha, but several other rhythms are also played.

The block attracts more than a million followers every year. In 2013, that number was more than 2,500,000 people. Its size is only matched by Galo da Madrugada in Recife.

References

Brazilian Carnival
Parades in Brazil
Rio Carnival
Festivals established in 1918